Víctor Hugo Diogo Silva (born April 9, 1958 in Treinta y Tres) is a retired football defender from Uruguay. He played in 33 games for the Uruguay national football team, scoring one goal.

Diogo played club football for Peñarol in Uruguay. He made his international debut on September 20, 1979 in a Copa América match against Paraguay (0-0) in Asunción. Diogo was a member of the team that competed at the 1986 FIFA World Cup in Mexico.

Between 1986 and 1989 he played for Palmeiras of Brazil.

References

External links
  Profile

1958 births
Living people
People from Treinta y Tres
Uruguayan footballers
Uruguayan expatriate footballers
Association football defenders
Uruguay under-20 international footballers
Uruguay international footballers
1979 Copa América players
1983 Copa América players
1986 FIFA World Cup players
Uruguayan Primera División players
Peñarol players
Sociedade Esportiva Palmeiras players
Expatriate footballers in Brazil
Uruguayan expatriate sportspeople in Brazil
Uruguayan people of Brazilian descent
Copa América-winning players